Libero Casali (born 23 September 1939) is a Sammarinese former sports shooter. He competed in the 50 metre rifle, three positions event at the 1972 Summer Olympics.

References

1939 births
Living people
Sammarinese male sport shooters
Olympic shooters of San Marino
Shooters at the 1972 Summer Olympics
Place of birth missing (living people)